Jhajhar is a village, situated in the erstwhile province of Shekhawati of Rajasthan, India. It is located in the Jhunjhunu District, approximately 7 km from Nawalgarh. Formally it was the part of Pentalisa of Bhojyana.

History
The Jagir of Jhajhar with other villages was granted to the Purshottam Singh, elder son of Thakur Todar Mal, ruler of Udaipurwati. Singh had three wives (amongst others), 3rd, was Phool Kanwar Mertani. He was succeeded by his son Prithvi Singh as the Thakur of Jhajhar, he married 1st, Biki, married 2ndly, Biki, married 3rdly, Udawat. He died fighting in the battle of Devli and Heerapura, north of Sambhar. He had four sons, after his death Jhajhar was divided into Chaar Panas (four parts). Due to the influence of the Shekhawats, no incident of theft or robbery happened under their rule in Jhajhar. The Shekhawat Sirdars of Jhajhar were the Bhomias (Landlords). Thakurs of Jhajhar paid allegiance to their overlords, the Maharajas of Jaipur, which was collected from Udaipurwati.

The Thakurs of Jhajhar belongs to Shekhawat sub clan (Bhojraj Ji Ka) of Kachwaha Dynasty of Jaipur.
Group of 45 villages of Udaipurwati was popularly known as Pentalisa. Jhajhar was one of them.

Chaar Pana of Jhajhar

 Fateh Singh Ji Ka Pana, named after Fateh Singh.
 Pana Malam Singh Sabhasinghot, named after Malum Singh. Shabha singh expired in early age and hence his son Malum Singh occupied his place.
 Karan Singh Ji Ka Pana, named after Karan Singh.
 Bhairubas
 Padam Singh Ji Ka Pana, named after Padam Singh.

Bhairubas

Bhairubas is in Karan Singh Ji Ka Pana of Jhajhar, located 1 km from Jhajhar. Bhairubas named after Bhairu Singh of Jhajhar.

Temples of Jhajhar

 Jamwai Mata Mandir, Jamway Mata is a Kuldevi of Kachwaha or Kachawa Dynasty.
 Sati ji Mandir, Mohini Sati Mata Mandir (Practice of Sati is banned in India.)
 Raghunath Mandir
 Hanuman Mandir, also known as Revtiya Mandir
 Gaytri Mandir
 ganesh mandir . also known as "jaati waale ganesh ji"
 shiri Hiramal ji maharaj mandir  " founded by gujjar community" information shared vikram gurjar....
 Buldiya Baba Mandir founded by saini community dan singh ke dhani
Googa ji ka mandir jhajhar - Nawalgarh road.

Fairs and festivals

Teej, Gangaur, Holi, Dussehra, Janmashtmi, Navratri and Diwali are celebrated in the village. The Rajputs and Mali specially celebrated the Dassehra and Gangaur. Gangaur is celebrated by Rajput ladies. The women dance the Ghoomar, every night for five nights. Isar and Gangaur are bedecked and displayed in every noble house all over Rajasthan. The festival is celebrated like a wedding.

Mohini sati mata  bhadava ka mela.and the specially function performed by the party the siddhi vinayak shri ganesh temple.
Sri Shaligramji Laddu Gopal Mandir Mandir celebrates Shivratri, Holi Utsav, Janmashtami, Sarad Purnima, Ankoot Mahotsav succeeding Deepawali.

References

External links
 Shekhawat

Shekhawati
Villages in Jhunjhunu district